A Flinders bar is a vertical soft iron bar placed in a tube on the fore side of a compass binnacle. The Flinders bar is used to counteract the vertical magnetism inherent within a ship and is usually calibrated as part of the process known as swinging the compass, where deviations caused by this inherent magnetism are negated by the use of horizontal (or quadrantal) correctors.

Where the deviation from a compass point cannot be counteracted through the use of Flinders bar, Kelvin's balls, Heeling error magnets and Horizontal magnets, a deviation card, or graph, is produced. This card, or graph, lists the deviation for various compass courses and is referred to by the navigator when compass courses need to be corrected.

It is named after the English navigator Matthew Flinders (1774-1814) who wrote a paper on ships' magnetism for the Royal Navy. He discovered the addition of a bar of iron would compensate for errors caused by his cargo during his travels to Australia.

References

External links 
 Flinders education unit from Royal Geographical Society of Queensland

Sailing ship components
Navigational equipment